Prehistoric Journey: A History of Life on Earth  is a book by Kirk R Johnson and Richard Stucky. It was published by Fulcrum Publishing.

Paleontology books